Manzella is a surname. Notable people with the surname Manzella include:

Cesare Manzella (1897–1963), Italian mobster
Darren Manzella (1977–2013), American military personnel and LGBT activist
Theresa Manzella, American politician
Tommy Manzella (born 1983), American baseball player